Grebennikov is a Russian masculine surname, its feminine counterpart is Grebennikova. It may refer to
Alla Grebennikova (born 1949), Russian swimmer
Jenia Grebennikov (born 1990), French volleyball player of Russian origin
Roman Grebennikov (born 1975), Russian politician
Viktor Grebennikov (1927–2001), Russian scientist, naturalist, entomologist and paranormal researcher 
Vladimir Grebennikov (1932–1992), Russian ice hockey player

Russian-language surnames